Sentrin-specific protease 2 is an enzyme that in humans is encoded by the SENP2 gene.

Function 

SUMO1 (UBL1; MIM 601912) is a small ubiquitin-like protein that can be covalently conjugated to other proteins. SENP2 is one of a group of protease enzymes that process newly synthesized SUMO1 into the conjugatable form and catalyze the deconjugation of SUMO1-containing species.[supplied by OMIM]

Interactions 

SENP2 has been shown to interact with NUP153.

References

Further reading